Marin Gheorghe (born 5 September 1959) is a retired Romanian rowing coxswain. He competed at the 1992 and 1996 Olympics and won a silver medal in eights in 1992. At the world championships he won 12 medals between 1987 and 2001, including four gold medals.

References

External links
 

1959 births
Living people
Romanian male rowers
Olympic rowers of Romania
Rowers at the 1992 Summer Olympics
Rowers at the 1996 Summer Olympics
Olympic silver medalists for Romania
Coxswains (rowing)
Olympic medalists in rowing
World Rowing Championships medalists for Romania
Medalists at the 1992 Summer Olympics